Pond Life is a series of five mini-episodes of Doctor Who which were written by Chris Chibnall. They were released over five days, 27–31 August 2012, on the official Doctor Who website. They follow the life of the Doctor, and Amy Pond and Rory Williams. All five were broadcast as part of the BBC Red Button service on 1 September 2012.

Episodes

Episode One – April
While a voiceover has the Doctor talking to the Ponds on the phone, he is shown with a surfboard, running away from Sontarans. When he is trapped, he throws the surfboard down into some lava in order to escape. He also recalls the memory of meeting Mata Hari in a Paris hotel room and recording some backing vocals for a rap song. He says that he should visit them any day, if he can get the TARDIS to fly there properly. The Ponds are then shown; Rory deletes the Doctor's phone message and they have a toast to the Doctor.

Episode Two – May
The TARDIS materializes inside Amy and Rory's house, and the Doctor bursts into their bedroom, waking them up. In a great lather the Doctor tells them that the world is endangered and that they need to save the planet now. Suddenly, he realises that they have no idea what he's on about, and goes to leave since he's obviously arrived before any of these Earth-shattering events are happening. After Amy questions his decision, he tells them not to worry, and that everything is safe. While saying this, some clips from "Dinosaurs on a Spaceship" are shown, with the Doctor, the Ponds, and others, all facing peril. The Doctor then wishes them a good night's sleep, and flies away. Unable to go back to sleep after this interlude of foreboding doom from the Doctor, the couple are seen in bed staring at the ceiling while Rory remarks "I really hate it when he does that".

Episode Three – June
Rory walks out of his room, and into the bathroom, only to be shocked by something and immediately walking out and shutting the door. He checks again inside the bathroom, still shocked. Eventually, Amy walks up to him, and requests to enter the bathroom. Rory reluctantly allows her to enter. Inside, they find an Ood sitting on their toilet, asking if they're in any need of assistance. Rory states "Ood on the loo", and Amy simply replies with "Yeah", and nodding.

Episode Four – July
The Doctor learns from the Ponds of the Ood, with the Doctor revealing that he wondered where he had gone; instead of wandering the TARDIS, as the Doctor had thought, he had gone into the Ponds' house during his last visit. The Ponds are then shown eating a cooked breakfast while the Doctor explains on the phone that the Ood was rescued from the middle of the Androvax conflict and was being transported back to the Ood Sphere. When the Doctor asks if the Ood was behaving, clips of the Ood performing housework are shown including making the bed, dispensing Amy's laptop and Rory's lunch for their "work day experience", hanging up laundry and cleaning the windows. When Rory questions the Doctor on the Ood's belief he is their butler, he is reassured that the Ood is "conditioned to serve" and the best thing to do is to allow him to continue. The Doctor ends the phone call as there's trouble in the TARDIS and as the Ponds hear the Doctor battling with it, they discuss their guilt at the Ood's service.

Episode Five – August
The Doctor calls the Ponds, asking them how they are, while fixing the light on the top of the TARDIS. He tells them that he dropped the Ood off back home, rode a horse in 11th century Coventry and inventing pasta a few centuries early. He also says that he visited them once, but they weren't there. The Doctor then asks if they're all right; then, answering his own question, says that he's foolish to worry and "The Ponds are always all right". While saying this, a silent clip of Rory walking away from their house in anger is shown, as well as a clip of Amy walking after him, yelling (possibly a phrase starting with "I hate..."), and then crying. The next clip shows the Doctor saying goodbye; then he seems to change his mind, points the sonic screwdriver at the phone and deletes the message that he'd just left. We then see Amy walk inside her house, place some items down and walk up to the phone, seeing if there's a message, which there isn't. She then says that they need their "raggedy man", as she referred to him in "The Eleventh Hour"; more specifically, that she, personally, needs the Doctor.

References

External links

2012 British television episodes
Eleventh Doctor episodes
Doctor Who mini-episodes